Tecla Marinescu-Borcǎnea (born 4 January 1960) is a Romanian sprint canoer who competed in the early 1980s. She won a gold medal in the K-4 500 m event at the 1984 Summer Olympics in Los Angeles.

Marinescu-Borcǎnea also won two bronze medals in the K-4 500 m event at the ICF Canoe Sprint World Championships, earning them in 1983 and 1986.

References

1960 births
Living people
Romanian female canoeists
Olympic canoeists of Romania
Olympic gold medalists for Romania
Olympic medalists in canoeing
Canoeists at the 1984 Summer Olympics
Medalists at the 1984 Summer Olympics
ICF Canoe Sprint World Championships medalists in kayak